Campbell Walter Watts (1895–1969) was a New Zealand philatelist who signed the Roll of Distinguished Philatelists in 1959.

References

Signatories to the Roll of Distinguished Philatelists
New Zealand philatelists
1895 births
1969 deaths